Miss Malaysia 1964, the first edition of Miss Universe Malaysia pageant, was held on 13 June 1964 at the Merdeka Stadium, Kuala Lumpur. Angela Filmer of Selangor was crowned by the wife of then Minister of Agriculture and Co-operatives Malaysia, Tan Sri Khir Johari, Puan Khalsom Abdul Rahman at the end of the event. She then represented Malaysia at the Miss Universe 1964 pageant in Miami, Florida.

Results

Delegates 
24 delegates were participated in the semi-finalist but only 13 delegates was chosen to compete in the grand finale.
  - Angeline Thio, 23
 / - Lim Choon Mei, 20
  - Rohani Mohamad Salleh, 18
  - Luciana Lai, 18
  - Margaret Choo, 19
  - Juriah Basir, 20
  - Sally Lee, 19
  - Leonie Foo Saw Pheng, 19
  - Habsah Hamdan, 18
  - Angela Filmer, 19
  - Vera Wee, 22
  - Susan Wright, 17

Notes 

 The next following year, Filmer went on to become the first winner of the Miss Asia 1965 pageant which was held in the Philippines.

References

External links 

1964 in Malaysia
1964 beauty pageants
1964
Beauty pageants in Malaysia